Coldharbourstores are a British experimental ambient pop band.

History
Original members David Read and Michael McCabe formed Coldharbourstores in 1998 with original singer Daniel Bowling and drummer Samuel R. Laws. The band, which now includes singer Lucy Castro and drummer Liam Greany, has released singles, albums and collaborative works across various labels including Rocketgirl, Enraptured and Fire Records. Their first album, More Than The Other, was released on the Rocketgirl label in 2002.

They have worked with musicians and producers such as Graham Sutton, Bark Psychosis, Fuxa and American author Scott Heim.

The band has twice musically interpreted the poems of James Joyce, in 2008 as part of the Chamber Music: James Joyce (1907). 1-36. album for Fire Records, and again in 2017 for the online project Waywords and Meansigns Opendoor Edition setting James Joyce's Finnegans Wake to music.

Their third album, Wilderness, was released in 2017 by Enraptured Records. It received a Metacritic score of 77 from 100 based on four reviews indicating generally favourable reviews. The record sleeve, designed by Martin Andersen, was included in "Pop Music 1967-2017. Graphics and Music" at Echirolles Centre Du Graphisme, France, an exhibition to celebrate the most iconic record sleeves (1967–2018). The exhibition re-opened in Paris in June 2018.

A new studio album, 'Vesta', was released in 2019 by Enraptured Records.

Select discography 
More Than The Other (2002)
Chamber Music: James Joyce (1907). 1-36. (2008)
Wilderness (2017)
Vesta (2019)

References

External links
 Facebook
 Interview with Coldharbourstores

Musical groups from London
Rocket Girl artists